Devils Branch may refer to:

Devils Branch (Little Persimmon Creek tributary), a stream in Georgia
Devils Branch (Runs Branch tributary), a stream in Georgia
Devils Branch (Knox Creek tributary), a stream in Kentucky and Virginia